Maniho is a genus of South Pacific intertidal spiders first described by Brian J. Marples in 1959.

Species
 it contains ten species, all found in New Zealand:
Maniho australis Forster & Wilton, 1973 – New Zealand
Maniho cantuarius Forster & Wilton, 1973 – New Zealand
Maniho centralis Forster & Wilton, 1973 – New Zealand
Maniho insulanus Forster & Wilton, 1973 – New Zealand
Maniho meridionalis Forster & Wilton, 1973 – New Zealand
Maniho ngaitahu Forster & Wilton, 1973 – New Zealand
Maniho otagoensis Forster & Wilton, 1973 – New Zealand
Maniho pumilio Forster & Wilton, 1973 – New Zealand
Maniho tigris Marples, 1959 – New Zealand
Maniho vulgaris Forster & Wilton, 1973 – New Zealand

References

Araneomorphae genera
Desidae
Spiders of New Zealand
Taxa named by Brian John Marples